Piet Hein Plantinga (29 June 1896 – 7 October 1944) was a Dutch male water polo player. He was a member of the Netherlands men's national water polo team. He competed with the team at the 1920 Summer Olympics.

References

External links
 

1896 births
1944 deaths
Dutch male water polo players
Water polo players at the 1920 Summer Olympics
Olympic water polo players of the Netherlands
Water polo players from Amsterdam
20th-century Dutch people